

Events

Pre-1600
 240 – Shapur I becomes co-emperor of the Sasanian Empire with his father Ardashir I.
 467 – Anthemius is elevated to Emperor of the Western Roman Empire.
 627 – King Edwin of Northumbria is converted to Christianity by Paulinus, bishop of York.
1012 – Duke Oldřich of Bohemia deposes and blinds his brother Jaromír, who flees to Poland.
1204 – The Crusaders of the Fourth Crusade breach the walls of Constantinople and enter the city, which they completely occupy the following day.

1601–1900
1606 – The Union Flag is adopted as the flag of English and Scottish ships.
1776 – American Revolution: With the Halifax Resolves, the North Carolina Provincial Congress authorizes its Congressional delegation to vote for independence from Britain.
1807 – The Froberg mutiny on Malta ends when the remaining mutineers blow up the magazine of Fort Ricasoli.
1820 – Alexander Ypsilantis is declared leader of Filiki Eteria, a secret organization to overthrow Ottoman rule over Greece.
1831 – Soldiers marching on the Broughton Suspension Bridge in Manchester, England, cause it to collapse.
1861 – American Civil War: Battle of Fort Sumter. The war begins with Confederate forces firing on Fort Sumter, in the harbor of Charleston, South Carolina.
1862 – American Civil War: The Andrews Raid (the Great Locomotive Chase) occurs, starting from Big Shanty, Georgia (now Kennesaw).
1864 – American Civil War: The Battle of Fort Pillow: Confederate forces kill most of the African American soldiers that surrendered at Fort Pillow, Tennessee.
1865 – American Civil War: Mobile, Alabama, falls to the Union Army.
1877 – The United Kingdom annexes the Transvaal.
1900 – One day after its enactment by the Congress, President William McKinley signs the Foraker Act into law, giving Puerto Rico limited self-rule.

1901–present
1910 – , one of the last pre-dreadnought battleships built by the Austro-Hungarian Navy, is launched.
1917 – World War I: Canadian forces successfully complete the taking of Vimy Ridge from the Germans.
1927 – Shanghai massacre of 1927: Chiang Kai-shek orders the Chinese Communist Party members executed in Shanghai, ending the First United Front.
  1927   – Rocksprings, Texas is hit by an F5 tornado that destroys 235 of the 247 buildings in the town, kills 72 townspeople and injures 205; third deadliest tornado in Texas history.
1928 – The Bremen, a German Junkers W 33 type aircraft, takes off for the first successful transatlantic aeroplane flight from east to west.
1934 – The strongest surface wind gust in the world at the time of 231 mph, is measured on the summit of Mount Washington, New Hampshire. It has since been surpassed.
  1934   – The U.S. Auto-Lite strike begins, culminating in a five-day melee between Ohio National Guard troops and 6,000 strikers and picketers.
1937 – Sir Frank Whittle ground-tests the first jet engine designed to power an aircraft, at Rugby, England.
1945 – U.S. President Franklin D. Roosevelt dies in office; Vice President Harry S. Truman becomes President upon Roosevelt's death.
  1945   – World War II: The U.S. Ninth Army under General William H. Simpson crosses the Elbe River astride Magdeburg, and reaches Tangermünde—only 50 miles from Berlin.
1955 – The polio vaccine, developed by Dr. Jonas Salk, is declared safe and effective.
1961 – Space Race: The Soviet cosmonaut Yuri Gagarin becomes the first human to travel into outer space and perform the first crewed orbital flight, Vostok 1.
1963 – The Soviet nuclear-powered submarine K-33 collides with the Finnish merchant vessel M/S Finnclipper in the Danish straits.
1970 – Soviet submarine K-8, carrying four nuclear torpedoes, sinks in the Bay of Biscay four days after a fire on board.
1980 – The Americo-Liberian government of Liberia is violently deposed.
  1980   – Transbrasil Flight 303, a Boeing 727, crashes on approach to Hercílio Luz International Airport, in Florianópolis, Brazil. Fifty-five out of the 58 people on board are killed.
  1980   – Canadian runner and athlete, Terry Fox begins his Marathon of Hope Run in St. John's, NF
1981 – The first launch of a Space Shuttle (Columbia) takes place: The STS-1 mission.
1983 – Harold Washington is elected as the first black mayor of Chicago.
1990 – Jim Gary's "Twentieth Century Dinosaurs" exhibition opens at the Smithsonian Institution National Museum of Natural History in Washington, D.C. He is the only sculptor ever invited to present a solo exhibition there. 
1992 – The Euro Disney Resort officially opens with its theme park Euro Disneyland; the resort and its park's name are subsequently changed to Disneyland Paris.
1999 – United States President Bill Clinton is cited for contempt of court for giving "intentionally false statements" in a civil lawsuit; he is later fined and disbarred.
2002 – A suicide bomber blows herself up at the entrance to Jerusalem's Mahane Yehuda Market, killing seven people and wounding 104.
2007 – A suicide bomber penetrates the Green Zone and detonates in a cafeteria within a parliament building, killing Iraqi MP Mohammed Awad and wounding more than twenty other people.
2009 – Zimbabwe officially abandons the Zimbabwean dollar as its official currency.
2010 – Merano derailment: A rail accident in South Tyrol kills nine people and injures a further 28.
2013 – Two suicide bombers kill three Chadian soldiers and injure dozens of civilians at a market in Kidal, Mali.
2014 – The Great Fire of Valparaíso ravages the Chilean city of Valparaíso, killing 16 people, displacing nearly 10,000, and destroying over 2,000 homes.

Births

Pre-1600
 811 – Muhammad al-Jawad, the ninth Imam of Shia Islam (d. 835)
 959 – En'yū, emperor of Japan (d. 991)
1116 – Richeza of Poland, queen of Sweden and Grand Princess of Minsk (d. 1156)
1432 – Anne of Austria, Landgravine of Thuringia (d. 1462)
1484 – Antonio da Sangallo the Younger, Italian architect, designed the Apostolic Palace and St. Peter's Basilica (d. 1546)
  1484   – Maharana Sangram Singh, Rana of Mewar (d. 1527)
1500 – Joachim Camerarius, German scholar and translator (d. 1574)
1526 – Muretus, French philosopher and author (d. 1585)
1550 – Edward de Vere, 17th Earl of Oxford, English courtier and politician, Lord Great Chamberlain (d. 1604)
1577 – Christian IV of Denmark (d. 1648)

1601–1900
1612 – Simone Cantarini, Italian painter and engraver (d. 1648)
1639 – Martin Lister, English naturalist and physician (d. 1712)
1656 – Benoît de Maillet, French diplomat and natural historian (d. 1738)
1705 – William Cookworthy, English minister and pharmacist (d. 1780)
1710 – Caffarelli, Italian actor and singer (d. 1783)
1713 – Guillaume Thomas François Raynal, French historian and author (d. 1796)
1716 – Felice Giardini, Italian violinist and composer (d. 1796)
1722 – Pietro Nardini, Italian violinist and composer (d. 1793)
1724 – Lyman Hall, American physician, clergyman, and politician, 16th Governor of Georgia (d. 1790)
1748 – Antoine Laurent de Jussieu, French botanist and author (d. 1836)
1777 – Henry Clay, American lawyer and politician, 9th United States Secretary of State (d. 1852)
1792 – John Lambton, 1st Earl of Durham, English soldier and politician, Lord Privy Seal (d. 1840)
1794 – Germinal Pierre Dandelin, Belgian mathematician and engineer (d. 1847)
1796 – George N. Briggs, American lawyer and politician, 19th Governor of Massachusetts (d. 1861)
1799 – Henri Druey, Swiss lawyer and politician, 2nd President of the Swiss Confederation (d. 1855)
1801 – Joseph Lanner, Austrian composer and conductor (d. 1843)
1816 – Charles Gavan Duffy, Irish-Australian politician, 8th Premier of Victoria (d. 1903)
1823 – Alexander Ostrovsky, Russian playwright and translator (d. 1886)
1839 – Nikolay Przhevalsky, Russian geographer and explorer (d. 1888)
1845 – Gustaf Cederström, Swedish painter (d. 1933)
1851 – José Gautier Benítez, Puerto Rican soldier and poet (d. 1880)
  1851   – Edward Walter Maunder, English astronomer and author (d. 1928)
1852 – Ferdinand von Lindemann, German mathematician and academic (d. 1939)
1856 – Martin Conway, 1st Baron Conway of Allington, English mountaineer, cartographer, and politician (d. 1937)
1863 – Raul Pompeia, Brazilian writer (d. 1895)
1868 – Akiyama Saneyuki, Japanese admiral (d. 1918)
1869 – Henri Désiré Landru, French serial killer (d. 1922) 
1871 – Ioannis Metaxas, Greek general and politician, 130th Prime Minister of Greece (d. 1941)
1874 – William B. Bankhead, American lawyer and politician, 47th Speaker of the United States House of Representatives (d. 1940)
1880 – Addie Joss, American baseball player and journalist (d. 1911)
1883 – Imogen Cunningham, American photographer and educator (d. 1976)
  1883   – Dally Messenger, Australian rugby player, cricketer, and sailor (d. 1959)
1884 – Tenby Davies, Welsh runner (d. 1932)
  1884   – Otto Meyerhof, German physician and biochemist, Nobel Prize laureate (d. 1951)
1885 – Robert Delaunay, French painter (d. 1941)
1887 – Harold Lockwood, American actor and director (d. 1918)
1888 – Dan Ahearn, Irish-American long jumper and police officer (d. 1942)
  1888   – Cecil Kimber, English automobile engineer (d. 1945)
1892 – Henry Darger, American writer and artist (d. 1973)
1894 – Dorothy Cumming, Australian-American actress (d. 1983)

  1894   – Francisco Craveiro Lopes, Portuguese field marshal and politician, 13th President of Portugal (d. 1964)
1898 – Lily Pons, French-American soprano and actress (d. 1976)

1901–present
1901 – Lowell Stockman, American farmer and politician (d. 1962)
1902 – Louis Beel, Dutch academic and politician, 36th Prime Minister of the Netherlands (d. 1977)
1903 – Jan Tinbergen, Dutch economist and academic, Nobel Prize laureate (d. 1994)
1907 – Zawgyi, Burmese poet, author, literary historian, critic, scholar and academic (d. 1990)
  1907   – Felix de Weldon, Austrian-American sculptor, designed the Marine Corps War Memorial (d. 2003)
1908 – Ida Pollock, English author and painter (d. 2013)
  1908   – Robert Lee Scott, Jr., American pilot and general (d. 2006)
1910 – Gillo Dorfles, Italian art critic, painter and philosopher (d. 2018)
  1910   – Irma Rapuzzi, French politician (d. 2018)
1911 – Mahmoud Younis, Egyptian engineer (d. 1976)
1912 – Frank Dilio, Canadian businessman (d. 1997)
  1912   – Hamengkubuwono IX, Indonesian politician, 2nd Vice President of Indonesia (d. 1988)
  1912   – Hound Dog Taylor, American singer-songwriter and guitarist (d. 1975)
1913 – Keiko Fukuda, Japanese-American martial artist (d. 2013)
1914 – Armen Alchian, American economist and academic (d. 2013)
1916 – Beverly Cleary, American author (d. 2021)
  1916   – Russell Garcia, American-New Zealander composer and conductor (d. 2011)
  1916   – Benjamin Libet, American neuropsychologist and academic (d. 2007)
1917 – Helen Forrest, American singer and actress (d. 1999)
  1917   – Vinoo Mankad, Indian cricketer (d. 1978)
  1917   – Robert Manzon, French racing driver (d. 2015)
1919 – István Anhalt, Hungarian-Canadian composer and educator (d. 2012)
  1919   – Billy Vaughn, American musician and bandleader (d. 1991)
1921 – Robert Cliche, Canadian lawyer, judge, and politician (d. 1978)
1922 – Simon Kapwepwe, Zambian politician, 2nd Vice President of Zambia (d. 1980)
1923 – Ann Miller, American actress, singer, and dancer (d. 2004)
1924 – Raymond Barre, French economist and politician, Prime Minister of France (d. 2007)
  1924   – Peter Safar, Austrian physician and academic (d. 2003)
  1924   – Curtis Turner, American race car driver (d. 1970)
1925 – Evelyn Berezin, American computer scientist and engineer (d. 2018)
  1925   – Ned Miller, American country music singer and songwriter (d. 2016)
  1925   – Oliver Postgate, English animator, puppeteer, and screenwriter (d. 2008)
1926 – Jane Withers, American actress (d. 2021) 
1927 – Thomas Hemsley, English baritone (d. 2013)
  1927   – Alvin Sargent, American screenwriter (d. 2019)
1928 – Hardy Krüger, German actor (d. 2022)
  1928   – Jean-François Paillard, French conductor (d. 2013)
1929 – Elspet Gray, Scottish actress (d. 2013)
  1929   – Mukhran Machavariani, Georgian poet and educator (d. 2010)
1930 – John Landy, Australian runner and politician, 26th Governor of Victoria (d. 2022)
  1930   – Bryan Magee, English philosopher and politician (d. 2019)
  1930   – Manuel Neri, American sculptor and painter
  1930   – Pythagoras Papastamatiou, Greek lyricist and playwright (d. 1979) 
  1930   – Michał Życzkowski, Polish technician and educator (d. 2006)
1931 – Leonid Derbenyov, Russian poet and songwriter (d. 1995)
1932 – Lakshman Kadirgamar, Sri Lankan lawyer and politician, 5th Sri Lankan Minister of Foreign Affairs (d. 2005)
  1932   – Jean-Pierre Marielle, French actor (d. 2019)
  1932   – Tiny Tim, American singer and ukulele player (d. 1996)
1933 – Montserrat Caballé, Spanish soprano and actress (d. 2018)
1934 – Heinz Schneiter, Swiss footballer and manager (d. 2017)
1935 – Jimmy Makulis, Greek singer (d. 2007) 
1936 – Charles Napier, American actor (d. 2011)
  1936   – Kennedy Simmonds, Kittitian politician, 4th Prime Minister of Saint Kitts and Nevis
1937 – Dennis Banks, American author and activist (d. 2017)
  1937   – Igor Volk, Ukrainian-Russian colonel, pilot, and astronaut (d. 2017)
1939 – Alan Ayckbourn, English director and playwright
  1939   – Johnny Raper, Australian rugby league player and coach (d. 2022)
1940 – Woodie Fryman, American baseball player (d. 2011)
  1940   – Herbie Hancock, American pianist, composer, and bandleader 
1941 – Bobby Moore, English footballer and manager (d. 1993)
1942 – Bill Bryden, Scottish actor, director, and screenwriter
  1942   – Carlos Reutemann, Argentinian race car driver and politician (d. 2021)
  1942   – Jacob Zuma, South African politician, 4th President of South Africa
1943 – Sumitra Mahajan, Indian politician, 16th Speaker of the Lok Sabha
1944 – Lisa Jardine, English historian, author, and academic (d. 2015)
  1944   – John Kay, German-Canadian singer-songwriter, guitarist, and producer
1945 – Lee Jong-wook, South Korean physician and diplomat (d. 2006)
1946 – John Dunsworth, Canadian actor and comedian (d. 2017)
  1946   – Ed O'Neill, American actor and comedian
  1946   – George Robertson, Baron Robertson of Port Ellen, Scottish politician and diplomat, 10th Secretary General of NATO
1947 – Roy M. Anderson, English epidemiologist, zoologist, and academic
  1947   – Martin Brasier, English palaeontologist, biologist, and academic (d. 2014)
  1947   – Tom Clancy, American historian and author (d. 2013) 
  1947   – David Letterman, American comedian and talk show host
1948 – Jeremy Beadle, English television host and producer (d. 2008)
  1948   – Joschka Fischer, German academic and politician
  1948   – Christos Iakovou, Greek weightlifter 
  1948   – Marcello Lippi, Italian footballer, manager, and coach
1949 – Scott Turow, American lawyer and author
1950 – Flavio Briatore, Italian businessman
  1950   – David Cassidy, American singer-songwriter and guitarist (d. 2017)
  1950   – Joyce Banda, Malawian politician, 4th president of Malawi
  1950   – Nick Sackman, English composer and educator
1951 – Tom Noonan, American actor
1952 – Reuben Gant, American football player
  1952   – Leicester Rutledge, New Zealand rugby player
  1952   – Gary Soto, American poet, novelist, and memoirist
  1952   – Ralph Wiley, American journalist (d. 2004)
1953 – Tanino Liberatore, Italian author and illustrator
1954 – John Faulkner, Australian educator and politician, 52nd Australian Minister for Defence
  1954   – Steve Stevaert, Belgian businessman and politician (d. 2015)
  1954   – Pat Travers, Canadian singer-songwriter and guitarist
1955 – Fabian Hamilton, English graphic designer, engineer, and politician
1956 – Andy Garcia, Cuban-American actor, director, and producer
  1956   – Herbert Grönemeyer, German singer-songwriter and actor
1957 – Greg Child, Australian mountaineer and author
  1957   – Vince Gill, American singer-songwriter and guitarist 
  1957   – Tama Janowitz, American novelist and short story writer
1958 – Will Sergeant, English guitarist 
  1958   – Klaus Tafelmeier, German javelin thrower
  1958   – Ginka Zagorcheva, Bulgarian hurdler
1960 – David Thirdkill, American basketball player
1961 – Corrado Fabi, Italian racing driver
  1961   – Charles Mann, American football player and sportscaster
  1961   – Magda Szubanski, English-Australian actress, comedian and writer
1962 – Art Alexakis, American singer-songwriter and musician
  1962   – Carlos Sainz, Spanish racing driver
  1962   – Nobuhiko Takada, Japanese mixed martial artist and wrestler, founded Hustle
1963 – Lydia Cacho, Mexican journalist and author
1964 – Chris Fairclough, English footballer and coach
  1965   – Amy Ray, American folk-rock singer-songwriter, musician, and music producer 
1965 – Kim Bodnia, Danish actor and director
  1965   – Chi Onwurah, English politician
  1965   – Gervais Rufyikiri, Burundian politician 
  1965   – Mihai Stoica, Romanian footballer and manager
1966 – Nils-Olav Johansen, Norwegian guitarist and singer 
  1966   – Lorenzo White, American football player
1967 – Sarah Cracknell, English singer-songwriter 
1968 – Alicia Coppola, American actress
  1968   – Toby Gad, German songwriter and producer
  1968   – Adam Graves, Canadian ice hockey player
1969 – Jörn Lenz, German footballer and manager
  1969   – Lucas Radebe, South African footballer and sportscaster
  1969   – Michael Jackson, American football player and politician (d. 2017)
1970 – Sylvain Bouchard, Canadian speed skater
1971 – Nicholas Brendon, American actor 
  1971   – Shannen Doherty, American actress, director, and producer
1972 – Paul Lo Duca, American baseball player and sportscaster
1973 – J. Scott Campbell, American author and illustrator
  1973   – Ryan Kisor, American trumpet player and composer
  1973   – Antonio Osuna, Mexican-American baseball player
  1973   – Christian Panucci, Italian footballer and manager
1974 – Belinda Emmett, Australian actress (d. 2006)
  1974   – Bryan Fletcher, Australian rugby league player and sportscaster
  1974   – Roman Hamrlík, Czech ice hockey player
  1974   – Marley Shelton, American actress
1974 – Sylvinho, Brazilian footballer and manager
1976 – Olga Kotlyarova, Russian runner
  1976   – Brad Miller, American basketball player
1977 – Giovanny Espinoza, Ecuadorian footballer
  1977   – Sarah Monahan, Australian actress
  1977   – Jason Price, Welsh footballer
  1977   – Glenn Rogers, Australian-Scottish cricketer
1978 – Guy Berryman, Scottish bass player and producer 
  1978   – Scott Crary, American director, producer, and screenwriter
  1978   – Svetlana Lapina, Russian high jumper
  1978   – Robin Walker, English businessman and politician
1979 – Claire Danes, American actress 
  1979   – Elena Grosheva, Russian gymnast
  1979   – Mateja Kežman, Serbian footballer
  1979   – Jennifer Morrison, American actress 
  1979   – Cristian Ranalli, Italian footballer
  1979   – Lee Soo-young, South Korean singer
1980 – Sara Head, Welsh Paralympic table tennis champion
  1980   – Brian McFadden, Irish singer-songwriter 
1981 – Yuriy Borzakovskiy, Russian runner
  1981   – Nicolás Burdisso, Argentinian footballer
  1981   – Tulsi Gabbard, American politician
  1981   – Grant Holt, English footballer and professional wrestler
  1981   – Hisashi Iwakuma, Japanese baseball pitcher
1983 – Jelena Dokic, Serbian-Australian tennis player
  1983   – Luke Kibet, Kenyan runner
1984 – Aleksey Dmitrik, Russian high jumper
1985 – Brennan Boesch, American baseball player
  1985   – Hitomi Yoshizawa, Japanese singer 
1986 – Brad Brach, American baseball pitcher  
  1986   – Blerim Džemaili, Swiss footballer
  1986   – Marcel Granollers, Spanish tennis player
  1986   – Jonathan Pitroipa, Burkinabé footballer
1987 – Brooklyn Decker, American model and actress
  1987   – Shawn Gore, Canadian football player
  1987   – Josh McCrone, Australian rugby league player
  1987   – Luiz Adriano, Brazilian professional footballer
  1987   – Brendon Urie, American singer, songwriter, musician and multi-instrumentalist
1988 – Ricky Álvarez, Argentinian footballer
  1988   – Stephen Brogan, English footballer
  1988   – Amedeo Calliari, Italian footballer
  1988   – Jessie James Decker, American singer-songwriter
1989 – Bethan Dainton, Welsh rugby union player
  1989   – Miguel Ángel Ponce, American-Mexican footballer
  1989   – Ádám Hanga, Hungarian basketball player
  1989   – Kaitlyn Weaver, Canadian-American ice dancer
  1989   – Valentin Stocker, Swiss footballer
1990 – Francesca Halsall, English swimmer
  1990   – Hiroki Sakai, Japanese footballer
1991 – Torey Krug, American ice hockey player
  1991   – Lionel Carole, French professional footballer 
  1991   – Oliver Norwood, English born Northern Irish international footballer
  1991   – Magnus Pääjärvi, Swedish ice hockey player
  1991   – Jazz Richards, Welsh international footballer
1992 – Chad le Clos, South African swimmer
1993 – Robin Anderson, American tennis player
  1993   – Jordan Archer, English-Scottish footballer
  1993   – Ryan Nugent-Hopkins, Canadian ice hockey player
1994 – Isabelle Drummond, Brazilian actress and singer
  1994   – Saoirse Ronan, American-born Irish actress
  1994   – Oh Sehun, South Korean musician
  1994   – Eric Bailly, Ivorian professional footballer
  1994   – Guido Rodríguez, Argentine footballer 
1995 – Pedro Cachín, Argentine tennis player
1996 – Matteo Berrettini, Italian tennis player
1996 – Elizaveta Kulichkova, Russian tennis player

Deaths

Pre-1600
45 BC – Gnaeus Pompeius, Roman general and politician (b. 75 BC)
 352 – Julius I, pope of the Catholic Church
 434 – Maximianus, archbishop of Constantinople
 901 – Eudokia Baïana, Byzantine empress and wife of Leo VI
1125 – Vladislaus I, Duke of Bohemia (b. 1065)
1167 – Charles VII, king of Sweden (b. c. 1130)
1256 – Margaret of Bourbon, Queen of Navarre, regent of Navarre (b. c. 1217)
1443 – Henry Chichele, English archbishop (b. 1364)
1500 – Leonhard of Gorizia, Count of Gorz (b. 1440)
1530 – Joanna La Beltraneja, Princess of Castile (b. 1462)
1550 – Claude, Duke of Guise (b. 1496)
1555 – Joanna of Castile, nominal Queen of Castile, Aragon and so on (b. 1479)

1601–1900
1675 – Richard Bennett, English politician, colonial Governor of Virginia (b. 1609)
1684 – Nicola Amati, Italian instrument maker (b. 1596)
1687 – Ambrose Dixon, English-American soldier (b. 1619)
1704 – Jacques-Bénigne Bossuet, French bishop and theologian (b. 1627)
1748 – William Kent, English architect, designed Holkham Hall and Chiswick House (b. 1685)
1782 – Metastasio, Italian-Austrian poet and composer (b. 1698)
1788 – Carlo Antonio Campioni, French-Italian composer (b. 1719)
1795 – Johann Kaspar Basselet von La Rosée, Bavarian general (b. 1710)
1814 – Charles Burney, English composer and historian (b. 1726)
1817 – Charles Messier, French astronomer and academic (b. 1730)
1850 – Adoniram Judson, American lexicographer and missionary (b. 1788)
1866 – Peter Hesketh-Fleetwood, English politician, founded Fleetwood (b. 1801)
1872 – Nikolaos Mantzaros, Greek composer and theorist (b. 1795)
1878 – William M. Tweed, American lawyer and politician (b. 1823)
1879 – Richard Taylor, Confederate general (b. 1826)
1885 – William Crowther, Dutch-Australian politician, 14th Premier of Tasmania (b. 1817)
1898 – Elzéar-Alexandre Taschereau, Canadian cardinal (b. 1820)

1901–present
1902 – Marie Alfred Cornu, French physicist and academic (b. 1842)
1906 – Mahesh Chandra Nyayratna Bhattacharyya, Indian scholar, academic, and philanthropist (b. 1836)
1912 – Clara Barton, American nurse and humanitarian, founded the American Red Cross (b. 1821)
1933 – Adelbert Ames, American general and politician, 30th Governor of Mississippi (b. 1835)
1937 – Abdülhak Hâmid Tarhan, Turkish playwright and poet (b. 1852)
1938 – Feodor Chaliapin, Russian opera singer (b. 1873)
1943 – Viktor Puskar, Estonian colonel (b. 1889)
1945 – Franklin D. Roosevelt, American lawyer and politician, 32nd President of the United States (b. 1882)
1953 – Lionel Logue, Australian actor and therapist (b. 1880)
1962 – Ron Flockhart, Scottish racing driver (b. 1923)
1966 – Sydney Allard, English racing driver and founder of the Allard car company (b. 1910)
1968 – Heinrich Nordhoff, German engineer (b. 1899)
1971 – Ed Lafitte, American baseball player and dentist (b. 1886)
1973 – Arthur Freed, American songwriter and producer (b. 1894)
1975 – Josephine Baker, French actress, activist, and humanitarian (b. 1906)
1976 – Christos Kakkalos, Greek mountain guide (b. 1882) 
1977 – Philip K. Wrigley, American businessman, co-founded Lincoln Park Gun Club (b. 1894)
1980 – William R. Tolbert, Jr., Liberian politician, 20th President of Liberia (b. 1913)
1981 – Prince Yasuhiko Asaka of Japan (b. 1887)
  1981   – Joe Louis, American boxer and wrestler (b. 1914)
1983 – Jørgen Juve, Norwegian football player and journalist (b. 1906)
  1983   – Carl Morton, American baseball player (b. 1944)
1984 – Edwin T. Layton, American admiral and cryptanalyst (b. 1903)
1986 – Valentin Kataev, Russian author and playwright (b. 1897)
1988 – Colette Deréal, French singer and actress (b. 1927)
  1988   – Alan Paton, South African historian and author (b. 1903)
1989 – Abbie Hoffman, American activist, co-founded Youth International Party (b. 1936)
  1989   – Sugar Ray Robinson, American boxer (b. 1921)
1992 – Ilario Bandini, Italian racing driver and businessman (b. 1911)
1997 – George Wald, American neurologist and academic, Nobel Prize laureate (b. 1906)
1998 – Robert Ford, Canadian poet and diplomat (b. 1915)
1999 – Boxcar Willie, American singer-songwriter (b. 1931)
2001 – Harvey Ball, American illustrator, created the smiley (b. 1921)
2002 – George Shevelov, Ukrainian-American linguist and philologist (b. 1908)
2004 – Moran Campbell, Canadian physician and academic, invented the venturi mask (b. 1925)
2006 – William Sloane Coffin, American minister and activist (b. 1924)
2007 – Kevin Crease, Australian journalist (b. 1936)
2008 – Cecilia Colledge, English-American figure skater and coach (b. 1920)
  2008   – Patrick Hillery, Irish physician and politician, 6th President of Ireland (b. 1923)
  2008   – Jerry Zucker, Israeli-American businessman and philanthropist (b. 1949)
2010 – Michel Chartrand, Canadian trade union leader (b. 1916)
  2010   – Werner Schroeter, German director and screenwriter (b. 1945)
2011 – Karim Fakhrawi, Bahraini journalist, co-founded Al-Wasat (b. 1962)
2012 – Mohit Chattopadhyay, Indian poet and playwright (b. 1934)
  2012   – Rodgers Grant, American pianist and composer (b. 1935)
2013 – Robert Byrne, American chess player and author (b. 1928)
  2013   – Johnny du Plooy, South African boxer (b. 1964)
  2013   – Michael France, American screenwriter (b. 1962)
  2013   – Brennan Manning, American priest and author (b. 1934)
  2013   – Annamária Szalai, Hungarian journalist and politician (b. 1961)
  2013   – Ya'akov Yosef, Israeli rabbi and politician (b. 1946)
2014 – Pierre Autin-Grenier, French author and poet (b. 1947)
  2014   – Pierre-Henri Menthéour, French cyclist (b. 1960)
  2014   – Maurício Alves Peruchi, Brazilian footballer (b. 1990)
  2014   – Hal Smith, American baseball player and coach (b. 1931)
  2014   – Billy Standridge, American race car driver (b. 1953)
2015 – Paulo Brossard, Brazilian jurist and politician (b. 1924)
  2015   – Patrice Dominguez, Algerian-French tennis player and trainer (b. 1950)
  2015   – Alfred Eick, German commander (b. 1916)
  2015   – André Mba Obame, Gabonese politician (b. 1957)
2016 – Anne Jackson, American actress (b. 1925)
2016 – Mohammad Al Gaz, Emirati politician & diplomat (b. 1930) 
2017 – Charlie Murphy, American actor and comedian (b. 1959)
2020 – Tarvaris Jackson, American football player (b. 1983)
2021 – Joseph Siravo, American actor and producer (b. 1955)
2022 – Gilbert Gottfried, American comedian, actor, and singer (b. 1955)

Holidays and observances 
 Children's Day (Bolivia)
 Christian feast day:
 Adoniram Judson (Episcopal Church)
 Alferius
 Blessed Angelo Carletti di Chivasso
 Erkembode
 Pope Julius I
 Teresa of the Andes
 Zeno of Verona
 April 12 (Eastern Orthodox liturgics)
 Commemoration of first human in space by Yuri Gagarin:
 Cosmonautics Day (Russia)
 International Day of Human Space Flight
 Yuri's Night (International observance)
 Halifax Day (North Carolina)
 National Redemption Day (Liberia)

References

External links

 BBC: On This Day
 
 Historical Events on April 12

Days of the year
April